Barnsley Resort  is situated on the grounds of a historic former manor house near Adairsville, Georgia, United States. Originally known as Woodlands (later known as Barnsley Gardens), the estate was established by Godfrey Barnsley, originally of Liverpool, England.  He built the Italianate manor in the late 1840s.

History

Origin: Barnsley acquired the land from the state of Georgia after acquiring it from the Cherokee nation. The land was then divided into 160 acre plots. The original manor at Barnsley Resort was built for Godfrey's wife Julia. Before it was completed, Julia fell ill and died, and Barnsley suspended its construction. Later, he said he felt her presence at the site telling him to finish the house for him and his children. The mansion was built in the style of an Italian villa by the landscape architect Andrew Jackson Downing. During the American Civil War, the mansion had been  the site of a battle, and much of the house and Barnsley's possessions were ransacked by the Union Army. Barnsley lost his fortune during the Civil War and later moved to New Orleans before he died in 1873.  

Barnsley's descendants continued to live at Woodlands until the roof of the main house was blown off by a tornado in 1906. Barnsley's granddaughter, Adelaide Saylor, and her family who were living there at the time, moved into the kitchen wing and the main house was never restored, and eventually fell to ruins. In 1988 Prince Hubertus Fugger purchased the estate and began a major project to stabilize the ruins and rescue and restore the gardens.  The original boxwood hedges planted in the early 1840s still survived and had grown up into a thicket of small trees and vines. These were carefully cut back over a number of years to reveal the interweaving paths and flower beds of the original parterre garden. This is now one of the few surviving antebellum gardens of the southern United States.

References

External links
Godfrey Barnsley Papers, Manuscript, Archives, and Rare Book Library, Emory University
History and Overview
Godfrey Barnsley and Barnsley Gardens, Cartersville- Bartow County, GA Convention and Visitors Bureau
Getaways that are close to home
Camp Grown-up at Barnsley Resort
Barnsley Resort: 15 Reasons You Need A Date Night At This Exclusive Oasis
Reinvent The Concept Of Getting Away At Barnsley Resort

Houses completed in the 19th century
Houses in Bartow County, Georgia
Resorts in the United States
Ruins in the United States
Tourist attractions in Bartow County, Georgia
1840s establishments in Georgia (U.S. state)